is an action-platform video game by Capcom for the Game Boy. It is the second game in the handheld version of the Mega Man series after Mega Man: Dr. Wily's Revenge. It is noteworthy for having been developed by a different company than the rest of the Mega Man titles on the Game Boy.

The game follows Mega Man as he pursues his arch-enemy Dr. Wily, whose most recent ploy for world domination involves the theft of an experimental time machine. Mega Man confronts both Wily and a number of enemies from his past, including a new and mysterious robot named Quint. Just like other Game Boy games in the series, Mega Man II marries the features of two consecutive Nintendo Entertainment System (NES) titles, in this case, Mega Man 2 and Mega Man 3. In 2013, Mega Man II was made available on the Virtual Console of Japan's Nintendo eShop for the Nintendo 3DS. It was later released in the North American and PAL region eShops the following year.

Plot
The storyline of Mega Man II involves the hero Mega Man battling his arch-nemesis Dr. Wily as the latter once again attempts to take over the world. This time around the evil genius has stolen an experimental "Time Skimmer" from the world's Chronos Institute and used it to travel 37.426 years into the future. Meanwhile, Mega Man is sent to investigate an underground passageway containing enemy Robot Masters from his previous adventures. Mega Man destroys them again and makes his way to Wily's fortress, which contains four more Robot Masters from his past. Once they are destroyed, Mega Man advances and comes upon Quint, a future version of himself. Wily had captured Quint in the future, remodeled him, and brought him back to the present. After Mega Man beats him, Quint relinquishes his "Sakugarne" jackhammer weapon to the hero. Mega Man follows Wily to a space station and defeats him.

Gameplay

As with other games in the series, Mega Man II is a standard side-scrolling platformer that lets the player take control of the hero Mega Man as he traverses stages and defeats various enemies and bosses. The player is able to run, jump, and shoot as in the previous game, but is now able to slide along the ground as well. The outset of the game allows the player to choose among four stages to be completed in any order. Beating the Robot Master boss at the end of the stage allows the player access to its unique weapon for the remainder of the game. These weapons have limited ammunition that can be refilled by picking up items dropped by enemies. Spare energy tanks can be obtained and selected to completely refill the player's health.

Defeating some Robot Masters will grant Mega Man access to three adaptors for his canine companion Rush to be used in different environments. The Rush Coil allows Mega Man a very high jump; the Rush Marine turns the dog into a submarine for easy underwater mobility, and the Rush Jet lets Mega Man cross large distances. Like Dr. Wily's Revenge, Mega Man II takes many elements from the NES Mega Man games. The first four stages and their bosses (Wood Man, Air Man, Clash  Man, and Metal Man) come from Mega Man 2. After traveling to Wily's fortress, four new stages become available via a teleportation room. The bosses for these stages (Top Man, Hard Man, Magnet Man, and Needle Man) are taken from Mega Man 3.

Development and release
Capcom outsourced the development of Mega Man II to a different company than the one that had worked on Mega Man: Dr. Wily's Revenge. Series artist Keiji Inafune admitted that the design quality of Mega Man II feeling different from the other games was the result of the developer having very little knowledge of the series. For the next game in the Game Boy line, they decided to return to the developer of Mega Man: Dr. Wily’s Revenge.

Mega Man II has been re-released as part of the Nintendo Player's Choice line of budget titles in North America. The game was made available on the Japanese Nintendo Power cartridge service on March 13, 2001. Capcom announced a compilation release of the five Game Boy Mega Man games for a release in 2004 on the Game Boy Advance, but it was cancelled. On July 18, 2013, it was confirmed that Mega Man II was planned to release on the 3DS Virtual Console, which released in Japan on September 25, 2013, in North America on May 8, 2014. and in the PAL region on August 7, 2014.

Reception

Mega Man II received average reviews. Jeremy Parrish of 1UP.com opined Mega Man II as "Not Worth It!", summarizing it as "a random assortment of enemies and stages from Mega Man 2 and Mega Man 3 from NES, downsampled and downscaled for Game Boy".  Nintendo Power ranked the game 2nd in their top 10 Game Boy games of 1992.

Related media
The Archie Comics series incorporated elements of the game, though a full adaptation was not produced before the series went on hiatus. Quint notably appeared twice in issue 20, displaying elements of his own character as well as that of Rockman Shadow, the primary antagonist of Rockman & Forte: Challenger from the Future. He subsequently made appearances in issue 55, in which Dr. Light saw in a vision his conflict with the present-day Mega Man followed by Mega Man's transformation into Quint in the future.

Notes

References

External links

Official Rockman website 

1991 video games
Action video games
Game Boy games
Mega Man games
Mega Man spin-off games
Platform games
Side-scrolling video games
Single-player video games
Superhero video games
Thinking Rabbit games
Video games about time travel
Video games developed in Japan
Video games scored by Kenji Yamazaki
Virtual Console games for Nintendo 3DS
Virtual Console games